H. P. Lovecraft's Magazine of Horror was a quarterly horror magazine edited by Marvin Kaye and published by Wildside Press. The magazine was named after H. P. Lovecraft, an American author.

History and profile
Issue #1 was published on 11 April 2006 and was primarily edited by John Gregory Betancourt, with Marvin Kaye taking over the editorial duties and being listed as editor on this and subsequent issues. An interim issue numbered 1.5 was mailed free to subscribers. Issue #3 was a special Brian Lumley issue. The magazine was originally announced as a quarterly, but appeared on an irregular basis. It had its headquarters in Rockville, Maryland.

The magazine was "indefinitely suspended" after five issues. Issue #5 was published in 2009, after which the magazine was merged with Weird Tales.

See also
 Science fiction magazine
 Fantasy fiction magazine
 Horror fiction magazine

References

External links
Website

Literary magazines published in the United States
Quarterly magazines published in the United States
Defunct magazines published in the United States
Horror fiction magazines
H. P. Lovecraft
Magazines established in 2006
Magazines disestablished in 2009
Magazines published in Maryland